Alexei Mikhailovich Borodin (born June 30, 1975) is a professor of mathematics at the Massachusetts Institute of Technology.

Research
His research concerns asymptotic representation theory, relations with random matrices and integrable systems, and the difference equation formulation of monodromy.

Education and career
Borodin was born in Donetsk, the son of Donetsk State University mathematics professor Mikhail Borodin.
He competed for Ukraine in the 1992 International Mathematical Olympiad, earning a silver medal there.
In the same year, he began studying mathematics at Moscow State University, and (because of the collapse of the Soviet Union) was forced to choose between Ukrainian and Russian citizenship, deciding at that time to be Russian. He graduated from Moscow State in 1997 and received M.S.E. in computers and information science and Ph.D. in mathematics from the University of Pennsylvania.

He was a Clay Research Fellow and a researcher at the Institute for Advanced Study in Princeton, New Jersey.
Next, he taught at the California Institute of Technology from 2003 to 2010, before moving to MIT. In 2016–2017 he was a Fellow at the Radcliffe Institute at Harvard University.

Awards and honors
In 2008, Borodin won the European Mathematical Society Prize, one of ten prizes awarded every four years for excellence by a young mathematics researcher.  
In 2010, he was one of four Caltech faculty invited to present their work at the International Congress of Mathematicians. In 2015 he won the Loève Prize and the Henri Poincaré Prize.  In 2018 he became a Fellow of the American Academy of Arts and Sciences, and in 2019 he was awarded the Fermat Prize.

References

1975 births
Living people
20th-century Russian mathematicians
21st-century Russian mathematicians
Probability theorists
Moscow State University alumni
University of Pennsylvania alumni
California Institute of Technology faculty
International Mathematical Olympiad participants
Institute for Advanced Study faculty
Radcliffe fellows
University of Pennsylvania School of Engineering and Applied Science alumni